The 201st Pennsylvania House of Representatives District is located in Philadelphia County and includes the following areas:

 Ward 17 [PART, Divisions 01, 02, 03, 04, 05, 06, 07, 08, 09, 10, 11, 12, 13, 14, 15, 17, 18, 19, 20, 26, 27 and 28]
 Ward 49 [PART, Divisions 02, 03, 04, 05, 06, 07, 08, 09, 10, 11, 12, 13, 14, 15, 16, 17, 18, 19, 20, 21 and 22] 
 Ward 59

Representatives

References

Government of Philadelphia
201